Chasmoptera mathewsi is an insect in the spoonwing family (Nemopteridae). found in Western Australia.

It was first described in 1967 by Lucien Everard Koch and known only the holotype, a male specimen from Peron Peninsula, Shark Bay, WA.

The adults are diurnal flying insects, and the larvae are predatory.

References

External links
Chasmoptera mathewsi: images & occurrence data from Atlas of Living Australia

Insects of Australia
Nemopteridae
Insects described in 1967